Johann (or Jean) Bauhin (12 December 1541 – 26 October 1613) was a Swiss botanist, born in Basel. He was the son of physician Jean Bauhin and the brother of physician and botanist Gaspard Bauhin.

Biography
Bauhin studied botany at the University of Tübingen under Leonhart Fuchs (1501–1566). He then travelled with Conrad Gessner, after which he started a practice of medicine at Basel, where he was elected Professor of Rhetoric in 1566. Four years later he was invited to become the physician to Frederick I, Duke of Württemberg at Montbéliard, in the Franche-Comté where he remained until his death. He devoted himself chiefly to botany. His great work, Historia plantarum universalis, a compilation of all that was then known about botany, remained incomplete at his death, but was published at Yverdon in 1650–1651.

Bauhin nurtured several botanic gardens and also collected plants during his travels. In 1591, he published a list of plants named after saints called De plantis a divis sanctisve nomen habentibus.

Johann Bauhin died in Montbéliard.

Carl Linnaeus named the genus Bauhinia (family Caesalpiniaceae) for the brothers Johann and Gaspard Bauhin.

Works 
De plantis a divis sanctisve nomen habentibus, apud Conrad. Waldkirch, 1591.

References

External links
 Johann Bauhin info from the Hauck Botanical online exhibit 
 Online Galleries, History of Science Collections, University of Oklahoma Libraries – High-resolution images of works by and/or portraits of Johann Bauhin in .jpg and .tiff format.
 Historia at Edward Worth library
 

1541 births
1613 deaths
Scientists from Basel-Stadt
16th-century Swiss botanists
16th-century Swiss physicians
17th-century Swiss physicians
17th-century Swiss botanists
Swiss mycologists